Roland Pierre DuMaine (August 2, 1931 – June 13, 2019) was an American prelate of the Roman Catholic Church. He served as the first bishop of the Diocese of San José in California from 1981 to 1999.  He also served as an auxiliary bishop of the Archdiocese of San Francisco in California from 1978 to 1981.

Biography

Early life 
DuMaine was born in Paducah, Kentucky, on August 2, 1931.  DuMaine attended St. Joseph College in Mountain View, California and Saint Patrick's Seminary in Menlo Park, California. 

DuMaine was ordained a priest of the Archdiocese of San Francisco on June 15, 1957. DuMaine earned his Doctor of Education degree at the Catholic University of America in Washington, D.C., in 1961, where he served as assistant professor until 1963.

From 1963 through 1965, DuMaine taught at Junípero Serra High School in San Mateo. He then served as assistant superintendent and superintendent of schools for the archdioceses from 1965 to 1978. He was named prelate of honor on July 18, 1972.

Auxiliary Bishop of San Francisco 
DuMaine was named an auxiliary bishop of the Archdiocese of San Francisco and consecrated in San Francisco, California on June 29, 1978. He was the founding director of Catholic Television Network in Menlo Park from 1978 to 1981.

Bishop of San Jose 
On January 27, 1981, DuMaine was named by Pope John Paul II the first bishop of the new Diocese of San Jose, where he was installed on March 18, 1981.

Retirement and legacy 
DuMaine's request to retire as bishop of San Jose was accepted by John Paul II on November 27, 1999.

After his retirement, DuMaine remained active in national Bishops' Committees for Science and Human Values and for Women in Society and the Church. He participated in dialogues and conferences on science and religion, and taught in the Religious Studies departments of Stanford University and Santa Clara University. Santa Clara appointed him presidential professor of catholic theology.

DuMaine died on June 13, 2019, in Sunnyvale, California at age 87.

References

External links 
Roman Catholic Diocese of San Jose Official Site

Episcopal succession 

1931 births
2019 deaths
Roman Catholic bishops of San Jose in California
People from Paducah, Kentucky
People from San Jose, California
Saint Patrick's Seminary and University alumni
Catholic University of America alumni
Catholic University of America faculty
20th-century Roman Catholic bishops in the United States
Stanford University Department of Religious Studies faculty
Santa Clara University faculty
Catholics from Kentucky